Fowler is an unincorporated community in central Fowler Township, Trumbull County, Ohio, United States. It has a post office with the ZIP code 44418. It lies at the intersection of State Routes 193 and 305.

The community is part of the Youngstown–Warren–Boardman, OH-PA Metropolitan Statistical Area.

A post office called Fowler has been in operation since 1826. The community takes its name from Fowler Township.

References

Unincorporated communities in Trumbull County, Ohio
1826 establishments in Ohio
Populated places established in 1826
Unincorporated communities in Ohio